Lophopetalum is a genus of plants in the family Celastraceae.

Species include:
 Lophopetalum arnhemicum Byrnes
 Lophopetalum javanicum (Zoll.) Turcz.
 Lophopetalum micranthum Loes. 
 Lophopetalum sessilifolium Ridl.
 Lophopetalum wightianum Arn.

References

 
Celastrales genera
Taxonomy articles created by Polbot